Bear Creek is a stream in Boone County in the U.S. state of Missouri. It is a tributary of Rocky Fork Creek. Bear creek is approximately 6 miles long.

According to tradition, Bear Creek was named for an incident when a bear entered a pioneer family's cabin near the creek.

See also
List of rivers of Missouri

References

Rivers of Boone County, Missouri
Rivers of Missouri
Geography of Columbia, Missouri